United States v. Kebodeaux, 570 U.S. 387 (2013), was a recent case in which the Supreme Court of the United States held that the Sex Offender Notification and Registration Act (SORNA) was constitutional under the Necessary and Proper Clause.

Background
The Sex Offender Notification and Registration Act (SORNA) is a federal law requiring federal sex offenders to register in the States where they reside, study, and/or work.

The respondent, Anthony Kebodeaux, was convicted by a court-martial of a federal sex offense. After dishonorable discharge from the Air Force, Kebodeaux moved to Texas, where he registered with state authorities as a sex offender. When he moved within Texas, he failed to update his registration and was prosecuted under SORNA. The District Court convicted. He later appealed to the Fifth Circuit, which overturned his conviction under the Wetterling Act, as SORNA had not been passed at the time of his conviction.

Arguments

Petitioner's argument (U.S.)
Congress has the power to subject a federal sex offender to criminal penalties for failing to register or update said registration. The appeals court's decision to reverse Kebodeaux's SORNA conviction was based on a mistake in applying pre-SORNA law. Contrary to the court's decision, Kebodeaux could be prosecuted under the Wetterling Act.  is constitutional under the Necessary and Proper Clause as a "legitimate" consequence of the conviction under Smith v. Doe.

Respondent's argument (Kebodeaux)
SORNA was an unlawful expansion of federal authority as it infringed on the states' police power. Kebodeaux's conviction violated limits set by United States v. Comstock. Additionally, the Attorney General did not adopt a regulations applying SORNA to pre-enactment offenders until after Kebodeaux's SORNA-related sentence expired.

Decision

Majority opinion
The majority opinion, written by Justice Breyer, ruled that SORNA was constitutional under the Necessary and Proper Clause. Despite his release before SORNA's enactment, the release was unconditional, as opposed to what the Fifth Circuit said. Additionally, he was still subject to the Wetterling Act, which had similar requirements. This was because the crime he committed under the Uniform Code of Military Justice had been designated by the Director of the Bureau of Prisons to fall under the Wetterling Act. Congress had the power under the Military Regulation and the Necessary and Proper Clauses to apply civil consequences to the UCMJ crime.

Concurrences

Roberts
Chief Justice Roberts wrote a concurrence where he argued that the Court's opinion, with its discussion of the public safety concerns addressed by SORNA, could lead "incautious readers" to surmise the Court was endorsing a non-existent federal police power, citing United States v. Morrison.

Alito
Justice Alito also wrote a concurrence. In it, he argued that the fact that sex offenses under the UCMJ are usually only tried by military tribunals,  convicted offenders might not register with the State in which they resides.

Dissenting opinions

Scalia
Justice Scalia joined in Parts I, II, and III-B of Justice Thomas's dissent, but not Part III-A. He stated this was because he did not believe that what is necessary and proper to enforce a statute under an enumerated power is not necessary and proper to the execution of that power citing Gonzales v. Raich. Scalia stated that the Opinion did not declare that the Wetterling Act, on which they based their application to Kebodeaux, was necessary and proper, or that SORNA was designed to execute the preceding act.

Thomas
Justice Thomas wrote the main dissent. He argued that SORNA was an unconstitutional usurpation of State police power. This was because SORNA failed the legitimate use test Chief Justice John Marshall set forth in McCulloch v. Maryland. Additionally, since Kebodeaux had completed his sentence, he was exempt from coverage under the Military Regulation Clause. Thomas further argued that the decision in this case violated the precedent set by United States v. Comstock.

Subsequent history
The Fifth Circuit affirmed the conviction per curiam.

Notes

References
Petitioner's brief
Respondent's brief

External links
 
United States v. Kebodeaux on SCOTUSblog

2013 in United States case law
United States Supreme Court cases
United States Supreme Court cases of the Roberts Court